Orestis Menka (born 27 July 1992) is an Albanian professional footballer who plays as a goalkeeper for Greek Super League 2 club Levadiakos.

Club career

Early career
Menka moved to Levadeia, Greece, at the age of four and started his youth career at age 10, with the city's football-club Levadiakos, where he stayed five years before signing with PAOK together with a fellow Albanian compatriot Ergys Kaçe, where he stayed two years, then moved to Doxa Drama's youth team, was loaned for a year at Glyfada F.C. and then returned to Doxa Drama.

Doxa Drama
On 6 January 2013, Menka gained entry with the first team of Doxa Drama as he called up for the match against Panachaiki, but he was an unused substitute.
He called up in total of 7 times, but all of them was an unused substitute.

He made it his debut on 15 December 2013, by being included in the starting line-up in an away match against Anagennisi Giannitsa F.C. finished in the victory 1–2. He played 2 consecutive games by keeping the clean sheet, on 12 January 2014 against Anagennisi Karditsas and against Tyrnavos 05 on 19 January 2014, with both games finishing in goalless draws.  
Menka played a half-time match on 29 March 2014 against Vataniakos, match finished in the victory 2–3 where he conceded 1 goal as the 2nd was conceded by his substitute Kostas Davkos.

PANACHAIKI
Since the summer of 2020, he has been playing for Panachaiki.

International career
He played his first match for Albania national under-21 football team on 6 February 2013 against Macedonia U21, an friendly match finished in goalless draw 0-0. 
In the 2015 UEFA European Under-21 Football Championship he played two matches against Hungary U21 on 7 June 2013  and Bosnia and Herzegovina U21 on 11 June 2013.

International games and goals

Youth national team

Career statistics

Club

References

External links

1992 births
Living people
Sportspeople from Lushnjë
Albanian emigrants to Greece
Association football goalkeepers
Albanian footballers
Albania under-21 international footballers
Doxa Drama F.C. players
Apollon Pontou FC players
Football League (Greece) players
Albanian expatriate footballers
Expatriate footballers in Greece
Albanian expatriate sportspeople in Greece